Obturator vessels can refer to:
 Obturator artery
 Obturator veins

See also Obturator canal